Helsingin pitäjä may refer to:

 the former name of the Finnish city of Vantaa
 Helsingin pitäjän kirkonkylä, a district of Vantaa
 Helsingin pitäjä, an annual book series published by the Vantaa-Seura about the history of Vantaa